Änkküla is a village in Jõgeva Parish, Jõgeva County in eastern Estonia.

Lake Kuremaa is administratively on the territory of Änkküla.

References

 

Villages in Jõgeva County